2009 Elections to the Virginia House of Delegates were held on November 3, 2009. Prior to the election, Republicans held 53 seats, Democrats held 43 seats, and Independents held 2 seats (both of whom caucus with the Republicans).

There were 2 seats previously held by Democrats that were vacant on election day: the 69th (Frank Hall resigned April 14, 2009) and the 80th (Ken Melvin resigned May 1, 2009). Eight incumbent Democrats were defeated, one incumbent Republican was defeated, and one open Republican seat was won by a Democrat.

The composition of the House of Delegates in 2010 was 59 Republicans, 2 Independents who caucus with the Republicans, and 39 Democrats.

Results

Overview

By House of Delegates district 
Party abbreviations: D - Democratic, R - Republican, C - Constitution Party, I - Independent, IG - Independent Green, L - Libertarian

References

Virginia Public Access Project: House of Delegates
Virginia State Board of Elections
Villanueva declared winner in 21st District race

Virginia House of Delegates elections
Virginia